The McKeesport-Duquesne Bridge it is a truss bridge that carries vehicular traffic across the Monongahela River between McKeesport, Pennsylvania and Duquesne, Pennsylvania. The bridge connects Route 837 in Duquesne and Route 148 in McKeesport.

History
The bridge was planned in 1924 at the order of the Public Service Commission. The costs were apportioned amongst the railroads that were crossed, the local cities and the county.

Pennsylvania Railroad $85,000
Baltimore and Ohio Railroad $262,000
Pittsburgh and Lake Erie Railroad $110,200
City of McKeesport $105,800
City of Duquesne $24,000
balance paid by Allegheny County.

The bridge was opened on September 5, 1928 on the same day as the neighboring Clairton-Glassport Bridge.

The bridge is built near the mouth of Crooked Run (Monongahela River); it was near this point in 1755 that General Edward Braddock's forces crossed the Monongahela the first time on their way to what would be known as the Battle of Braddock's Field.

References

See also
List of crossings of the Monongahela River

Bridges over the Monongahela River
Bridges in Allegheny County, Pennsylvania
Road bridges in Pennsylvania
McKeesport, Pennsylvania
Truss bridges in the United States